The 1905–06 season was the 7th season for FC Barcelona.

Events
On October 6, 1905 Josep Soler became president.

Squad

Results

External links
www.fcbarcelona.cat Official Site

References

FC Barcelona seasons
Barcelona